Raja Muhammad Zakaria Khan Maqpoon is a Pakistani politician who is member of the Gilgit Baltistan Assembly.

Political career
Raja Muhammad Zakaria Khan Maqpoon contested 2020 Gilgit-Baltistan Assembly election on 15 November 2020 from constituency GBA-7 (Skardu-I) on the ticket of Pakistan Tehreek-e-Insaf. He won the election by the margin of 1,176 votes over the runner up Ex Chief Minister Gilgit Baltistan Syed Mehdi Shah of Pakistan Peoples Party. He garnered 5,290 votes while Shah received 4,114 votes.

References

Living people
Balti people
Gilgit-Baltistan MLAs 2020–2025
Politicians from Gilgit-Baltistan
Year of birth missing (living people)